Pierre Brousset (born 15 January 1989) is a French rugby referee.

Career

Brousset began as a semi-professional referee in 2014 and has been refereeing in the French Top 14 since the 2016–17 Top 14 season. He has been a regular referee in the European Rugby Champions Cup and EPCR Challenge Cup also.

References

Living people
1989 births
French rugby union referees
United Rugby Championship referees